The 1941 Tasmanian state election was held on 13 December 1941.

Retiring Members

No MHAs retired at this election.

House of Assembly
Sitting members are shown in bold text. Tickets that elected at least one MHA are highlighted in the relevant colour. Successful candidates are indicated by an asterisk (*).

Bass
Six seats were up for election. The Labor Party was defending four seats. The Nationalist Party was defending two seats.

Darwin
Six seats were up for election. The Labor Party was defending three seats. The Nationalist Party was defending three seats.

Denison
Six seats were up for election. The Labor Party was defending four seats. The Nationalist Party was defending two seats.

Franklin
Six seats were up for election. The Labor Party was defending four seats. The Nationalist Party was defending two seats.

Wilmot
Six seats were up for election. The Labor Party was defending three seats. The Nationalist Party was defending three seats.

See also
 Members of the Tasmanian House of Assembly, 1937–1941
 Members of the Tasmanian House of Assembly, 1941–1946

References
Tasmanian Parliamentary Library

Candidates for Tasmanian state elections